Castleknock is a civil parish and a townland located in the south-western corner of the modern county of Fingal, Ireland. The civil parish is part of the ancient barony of Castleknock. It is centred on the suburban village of Castleknock. The townland of Castleknock itself is the location of the eponymous "Cnucha's Castle" – Castleknock Castle. The town with the biggest population in the parish is Blanchardstown. In geology, the parish rests on a substratum of limestone and comprises 2943 statute acres, the whole of which is arable land.

History
In 1831, there were 4251 inhabitants in the parish of whom 3409 were Catholics. Lewis' Topography of Ireland of 1837 reported the same number of inhabitants. Lewis recorded that Abbotstown demesne was the most notable seat in the parish. It was the residence of the Falkiner baronets who later married into the neighbouring Hamilton family. In 1897, Ion Trant Hamilton was ennobled as Baron HolmPatrick

Ecclesiastical parishes
Like all civil parishes, this civil parish is derived from, and co-extensive with a pre-existing ecclesiastical parish of the same name, as used in the Church of Ireland. Along with other civil parishes in Ireland, its use as a unit of the local administrative unit was gradually replaced by the creation of Electoral Divisions in the Local Government (Ireland) Act of 1898. The parish formerly belonged to the priory of Malvern, in Worcestershire. In 1773, an Act of the Privy Council united the parish with the curacies of Clonsilla and Mulhuddart. The living (of the ecclesiastical parish) was a vicarage in the Diocese of Dublin which was: "... endowed with a portion of the great tithes, and united to the prebend of Castleknock and the rectory of Clonsillagh and curacy of Mullahidart, with cure of souls: it is in the patronage of the Bishop." In 1837, the tithes amounted to £560.

In the Church of Ireland, the Archdiocese of Dublin unites Castleknock and Mulhuddart in the "Grouped Parishes of Castleknock and Mulhuddart with Clonsilla". There are three extant church buildings that are still in use by the grouped parish:
 St. Brigid's, Castleknock, situated in the centre of Castleknock. The building – a listed national monument – was completed in 1870. It was rebuilt by a loan of £1000 from the Board of First Fruits and large subscriptions, in 1810. It features a three-stage tower to the west gable with a Gothic tympanum at the entrance and a stained glass window by Harry Clarke that is dedicated to Saint Hubert.
 St. Thomas', Mulhuddart, situated on the Kilbride Road near Hollystown Golf Club. The building – a listed national monument – was constructed in 1870. It features a polygonal bell tower in the south corner.
 St. Mary's, Clonsilla, situated at the western end of the Clonsilla Road near Clonsilla railway station. The building – a listed national monument – was constructed in 1846. It features stained glass windows by Evie Hone.

In the Catholic Church, the Archdiocese of Dublin divides the civil parish between the following ecclesiastical parishes:
 "Our Lady, Mother of the Church", Castleknock. 
 "St. Brigid's", Blanchardstown. 
 "St. Thomas, the Apostle", Laurel Lodge / Carpenterstown.

Gallery of church buildings

Location and composition
The whole parish is within the Dublin 15 postal district. Most of the territory of the parish is within the county of Fingal and administered by  Fingal County Council with the exception of three townlands that are in the city proper and administered by Dublin City Council. The core of the parish is centred on the townland and village of the same name. To the north of the parish, the Huntstown Power Station and Corduff subsupply station are located. The townland at this northern extremity of the parish is Huntstown, not to be confused with Huntstown and Littlepace in the neighbouring parish of Clonsilla. To the south, it is bounded by the River Liffey and Chapelizod. To the west, it is bounded by the civil parish of Clonsilla which is the location of Blanchardstown Shopping Centre. To the east lies the 8th lock of the Royal Canal in the townland of Pelletstown and the Cabra Gate of the Phoenix Park.

Populated places
Populated places in the civil parish include: Blanchardstown, Castleknock, Ashtown, Cabra, Corduff, Laurel Lodge.

Townlands
Within the civil parish of Castleknock, there are 22 townlands per the table below. For convenience, the table groups the townlands by their location in one of the modern local authority areas.

Gallery

References
From 

From official parish websites

From 

From 

Other sources

Civil parishes of the barony of Castleknock
Castleknock